Wiseana cervinata, a porina moth, is a species of moth belonging to the family Hepialidae. It was described by Francis Walker in 1865 and is endemic to New Zealand.

The wingspan is 34–38 mm for males and 44–55 mm for females. The colour of the forewings varies from pale tan to blackened. Adults are on wing from September to March.

The larvae feed on Trifolium species and various grasses. The interactions of this species with the Māori food crop kūmara has also been investigated, indicating that this species may have fed on kūmara in traditional kūmara gardens.

References

Hepialidae
Moths described in 1865
Moths of New Zealand
Endemic fauna of New Zealand
Endemic moths of New Zealand